Charles A. Allen was an American football coach. He served as the head football coach at Alma College in Alma, Michigan for one season, in 1900, compiling a record at Alma was 7–2–1.

Head coaching record

References

Year of birth missing
Year of death missing
Alma Scots football coaches